Siphona confusa is a Palearctic species of fly in the family Tachinidae.

Distribution
Europe, Russia, Canary Islands, Israel, Mongolia.

References

Tachininae
Diptera of Europe
Insects described in 1961